The Wooramel River is an ephemeral river in the Gascoyne region of Western Australia.

The river rises near McLeod Pyramid and flows in a westerly direction, joined by six tributaries including the Wooramel River North, Bilung Creek, One Gum Creek and Nyarra Creek. The river is crossed by the Carnarvon-Mullewa Road near Pandara, through the Carandibby Range, and crossed by the North West Coastal Highway near the Wooramel Roadhouse, then discharging into Shark Bay and the Indian Ocean near Herald Loop. The catchment area has been approximately 40% cleared. The river descends  over its  course.

The river has a non-pristine estuary that has been mostly unmodified.

The estuary contains the seagrass Ruppia megacarpa and is naturally open to the ocean for two to six weeks per year, usually following a wet winter or a cyclonic event.

See also

List of watercourses in Western Australia
 Wooramel Station
 Wooramel Seagrass Bank

References

Rivers of the Gascoyne region